Wake Up Ladies: The Series (Wake Up  The Series) is a 2018 Thai television series starring Niti Chaichitathorn (Pompam), Akhamsiri Suwanasuk (Jakjaan), Apissada Kreurkongka (Ice), Maneerat Kam-Uan (Ae) and Tipnaree Weerawatnodom (Namtan).

Produced by GMMTV together with Parbdee Taweesuk, the series was one of the ten television series for 2018 showcased by GMMTV in their "Series X" event on 1 February 2018. It premiered on One31 and LINE TV on 17 March 2018, airing on Saturdays at 22:15 ICT and 23:15 ICT, respectively. The series concluded on 16 June 2018 and was rerun on GMM 25 from 4 February 2019 to 18 March 2019, airing on Mondays and Tuesdays at 21:25 ICT.

The series was rerun again on GMM 25 starting 13 July 2020 airing on Mondays and Tuesdays at 23:00 ICT.

Cast and characters 
Below are the cast of the series:

Main 
 Niti Chaichitathorn (Pompam) as Dr. Nat
 Akhamsiri Suwanasuk (Jakjaan) as Jane
 Apissada Kreurkongka (Ice) as Chloe
 Maneerat Kam-Uan (Ae) as Aoey
 Tipnaree Weerawatnodom (Namtan) as Tata

Supporting 
 Nuttawut Jenmana (Max) as Toon
 Apisit Opasaimlikit (Joey Boy) as A
 Pongsatorn Jongwilas (Phuak) as Lor
 Thanat Lowkhunsombat (Lee) as Saifah
 Kanaphan Puitrakul (First) as Ryu
 Benjamin Joseph Varney as Boy
 Popetorn Soonthornyanakij (Two) as Joe
 Surapol Poonpiriya (Alex) as Chloe's father
 Preya Wongrabeb (Mam) as Tata's mother
 Thongpoom Siripipat (Big) as Ton

Guest role 
 Ployshompoo Supasap (Jan) as New
 Jirakit Thawornwong (Mek) as Pat (Ep. 5 – 12)

Soundtracks

References

External links 
 Wake Up Ladies: The Series on GMM 25 website 
 Wake Up Ladies: The Series on LINE TV
 GMMTV

Television series by GMMTV
Thai romantic comedy television series
Thai drama television series
2018 Thai television series debuts
2018 Thai television series endings
GMM 25 original programming
Television series by Parbdee Taweesuk